Bhagher/Bhaghair is a village in Mandi district of Himachal Pradesh, India.

Villages in Mandi district